Joseph of Arimathea was, according to all four canonical gospels, the man who assumed responsibility for the burial of Jesus after his crucifixion. The historical location of Arimathea is uncertain, although it has been identified with several towns. A number of stories that developed during the Middle Ages connect him with Glastonbury, England and also with the Holy Grail legend.

Gospel narratives
Matthew 27 describes him simply as a rich man and disciple of Jesus, but according to Mark 15 Joseph of Arimathea was "a respected member of the council, who was also himself looking for the kingdom of God". Luke 23 adds that he "had not consented to their decision and action".

According to John 19, upon hearing of Jesus' death, this secret disciple of Jesus "asked Pilate that he might take away the body of Jesus, and Pilate gave him permission." Joseph immediately purchased a linen shroud and proceeded to Golgotha to take the body of Jesus down from the cross. Luke 23:55-56 states that the women "who had come with him from Galilee" prepared the spices and ointments. 

The disciples then conveyed the prepared corpse to a man-made cave hewn from rock in a garden nearby. The Gospel of Matthew alone suggests that this was Joseph's own tomb. The burial was undertaken speedily, "for the Sabbath was drawing on".

Veneration

Joseph of Arimathea is venerated as a saint by the Roman Catholic, Eastern Orthodox, and some Protestant churches. The traditional Roman calendar marked his feast day on 17 March, but he is now listed, along with Saint Nicodemus, on 31 August in the Martyrologium Romanum. Eastern Orthodox churches commemorate him on the Third Sunday of Pascha (i.e., the second Sunday after Easter) and on 31 July, the date shared by Lutheran churches. He is included in the Myrrhbearers. 

Although a series of legends developed during the Middle Ages (perhaps elaborations of early New Testament apocrypha) tied this Joseph to Britain as well as the Holy Grail, he is not currently on the abbreviated liturgical calendar of the Church of England, although this Joseph is on the calendars of some churches of the Anglican Communion, such as the Episcopal Church, which commemorates him on 1 August.

Old Testament prophecy

Many Christians interpret Joseph's role as fulfilling Isaiah's prediction that the grave of the "Suffering Servant" would be with a rich man (Isaiah 53:9), assuming that Isaiah was referring to the Messiah. The prophecy in Isaiah chapter 53 is known as the "Man of Sorrows" passage:

The Greek Septuagint text:

Development of legends

Since the 2nd century, a mass of legendary detail has accumulated around the figure of Joseph of Arimathea in addition to the New Testament references. Joseph is referenced in apocryphal and non-canonical accounts such as the Acts of Pilate and the medieval Gospel of Nicodemus.  Joseph is mentioned in the works of early church historians such as Irenaeus, Hippolytus, Tertullian, and Eusebius, who added details not found in the canonical accounts. Francis Gigot, writing in the Catholic Encyclopedia, states that "the additional details which are found concerning him in the apocryphal Acta Pilati ("Acts of Pilate"), are unworthy of credence."  The Narrative of Joseph of Arimathea, a medieval work, is even purportedly written by him directly, although it adds more details on the robbers at Jesus's crucifixion than Joseph himself. He also appears in the ancient non-canonical text the Gospel of Peter.

Hilary of Poitiers (4th century) enriched the legend, and John Chrysostom, the Patriarch of Constantinople from 397 to 403, was the first to write that Joseph was one of the Seventy Apostles appointed in Luke 10.

During the late 12th century, Joseph became connected with the Arthurian cycle, appearing in them as the first keeper of the Holy Grail. This idea first appears in Robert de Boron's Joseph d'Arimathie, in which Joseph receives the Grail from an apparition of Jesus and sends it with his followers to Britain. This theme is elaborated upon in Boron's sequels and in subsequent Arthurian works penned by others. Later retellings of the story contend that Joseph of Arimathea travelled to Britain and became the first Christian bishop in the Isles, a claim Gigot characterizes as a fable.

Gospel of Nicodemus
The Gospel of Nicodemus, a text appended to the Acts of Pilate, provides additional details about Joseph. For instance, after Joseph asked Pilate for the body of the Christ and prepared the body with Nicodemus' help, Christ's body was delivered to a new tomb that Joseph had built for himself. In the Gospel of Nicodemus, the Jewish elders express anger at Joseph for burying the body of Christ, saying:

The Jewish elders then captured Joseph, imprisoned him, and placed a seal on the door to his cell after first posting a guard. Joseph warned the elders, "The Son of God whom you hanged upon the cross, is able to deliver me out of your hands.  All your wickedness will return upon you."

Once the elders returned to the cell, the seal was still in place, but Joseph was gone.  The elders later discover that Joseph had returned to Arimathea.  Having a change in heart, the elders desired to have a more civil conversation with Joseph about his actions and sent a letter of apology to him by means of seven of his friends.  Joseph travelled back from Arimathea to Jerusalem to meet with the elders, where they questioned him about his escape.  He told them this story:

According to the Gospel of Nicodemus, Joseph testified to the Jewish elders, and specifically to chief priests Caiaphas and Annas that Jesus had risen from the dead and ascended to heaven, and he indicated that others were raised from the dead at the resurrection of Christ (repeating Matt 27:52–53). He specifically identified the two sons of the high-priest Simeon (again in Luke 2:25–35). The elders Annas, Caiaphas, Nicodemus, and Joseph himself, along with Gamaliel under whom Paul of Tarsus studied, travelled to Arimathea to interview Simeon's sons Charinus and Lenthius.

Other medieval texts
Medieval interest in Joseph centered on two themes, that of Joseph as the founder of British Christianity (even before it had taken hold in Rome), and that of Joseph as the original guardian of the Holy Grail.

Britain

Many legends about the arrival of Christianity in Britain abounded during the Middle Ages. Early writers do not connect Joseph to this activity, however. Tertullian wrote in Adversus Judaeos that Britain had already received and accepted the Gospel in his lifetime, writing, "all the limits of the Spains, and the diverse nations of the Gauls, and the haunts of the Britons—inaccessible to the Romans, but subjugated to Christ."

Tertullian does not say how the Gospel came to Britain before AD 222. However, Eusebius of Caesaria, one of the earliest and most comprehensive of church historians, wrote of Christ's disciples in Demonstratio Evangelica, saying that "some have crossed the Ocean and reached the Isles of Britain." Hilary of Poitiers also wrote that the Apostles had built churches and that the Gospel had passed into Britain. The writings of Pseudo-Hippolytus include a list of the seventy disciples whom Jesus sent forth in Luke 10, one of which is Aristobulus of Romans 16:10, called "bishop of Britain".

In none of these earliest references to Christianity's arrival in Britain is Joseph of Arimathea mentioned. William of Malmesbury's De Antiquitate Glastoniensis Ecclesiae ("On the Antiquity of the Church of Glastonbury", circa 1125) has not survived in its original edition, and the stories involving Joseph of Arimathea are contained in subsequent editions that abound in interpolations placed by the Glastonbury monks "in order to increase the Abbey's prestige – and thus its pilgrim trade and prosperity"  In his Gesta Regum Anglorum (History of The Kings of England, finished in 1125), William of Malmesbury wrote that Glastonbury Abbey was built by preachers sent by Pope Eleuterus to Britain, however also adding: "Moreover there are documents of no small credit, which have been discovered in certain places to the following effect: 'No other hands than those of the disciples of Christ erected the church of Glastonbury'", but here William did not explicitly link Glastonbury with Joseph of Arimathea, but instead emphasizes the possible role of Philip the Apostle: "if Philip, the Apostle, preached to the Gauls, as Freculphus relates in the fourth chapter of his second book, it may be believed that he also planted the word on this side of the channel also."

In 1989 A. W. Smith critically examined the accretion of legends around Joseph of Arimathea, by which the poem hymn of William Blake And did those feet in ancient time is commonly held as "an almost secret yet passionately held article of faith among certain otherwise quite orthodox Christians" and Smith concluded "that there was little reason to believe that an oral tradition concerning a visit made by Jesus to Britain existed before the early part of the twentieth century". Sabine Baring-Gould recounted a Cornish story how "Joseph of Arimathea came in a boat to Cornwall, and brought the child Jesus with him, and the latter taught him how to extract the tin and purge it of its wolfram. This story possibly grew out of the fact that the Jews under the Angevin kings farmed the tin of Cornwall." In its most developed version, Joseph, a tin merchant, visited Cornwall, accompanied by his nephew, the boy Jesus. Reverend C.C. Dobson (1879–1960) made a case for the authenticity of the Glastonbury legenda. The case was argued more recently by the Church of Scotland minister Dr Gordon Strachan (1934–2010)  and by the former archaeologist Dennis Price.

Holy Grail
The legend that Joseph was given the responsibility of keeping the Holy Grail was the product of Robert de Boron, who essentially expanded upon stories from Acts of Pilate. In Boron's Joseph d'Arimathe, Joseph is imprisoned much as in the Acts of Pilate, but it is the Grail that sustains him during his captivity. Upon his release he founds his company of followers, who take the Grail to Britain, though Joseph does not go. The origin of the association between Joseph and Britain is not entirely clear, though in subsequent romances such as Perlesvaus, Joseph travels to Britain, bringing relics with him. In the Lancelot-Grail cycle, a vast Arthurian composition that took much from Robert, it is not Joseph but his son Josephus who is considered the primary holy man of Britain.

Later authors sometimes mistakenly or deliberately treated the Grail story as truth. Such stories were inspired by the account of John of Glastonbury, who assembled a chronicle of the history of Glastonbury Abbey around 1350 and who wrote that Joseph, when he came to Britain, brought with him vessels containing the blood and sweat of Christ (without using the word Grail). This account inspired the future claims of the Grail, including the claim involving the Nanteos Cup on display in the museum in Aberystwyth. There is no reference to this tradition in ancient or medieval text. John of Glastonbury further claims that King Arthur was descended from Joseph, listing the following imaginative pedigree through King Arthur's mother:

Elizabeth I cited Joseph's missionary work in England when she told Roman Catholic bishops that the Church of England pre-dated the Roman Church in England.

Other legends
When Joseph set his walking staff on the ground to sleep, it miraculously took root, leafed out, and blossomed as the "Glastonbury Thorn". The retelling of such miracles encouraged the pilgrim trade at Glastonbury until the abbey was dissolved in 1539, during the English Reformation. The mytheme of the staff that Joseph of Arimathea set in the ground at Glastonbury, which broke into leaf and flower as the Glastonbury Thorn is a common miracle in hagiography. Such a miracle is told of the Anglo-Saxon saint Etheldreda:

Medieval interest in genealogy raised claims that Joseph was a relative of Jesus; specifically, Mary's uncle, or according to some genealogies, Joseph's uncle. A genealogy for the family of Joseph of Arimathea and the history of his further adventures in the east provide material for Holy Grail romances Estoire del Saint Graal, Perlesvaus, and the Queste del Saint Graal.

Another legend, as recorded in Flores Historiarum is that Joseph is in fact the Wandering Jew, a man cursed by Jesus to walk the Earth until the Second Coming.

Arimathea

Arimathea is not otherwise documented, though it was "a town of Judea" according to Luke 23:51. Arimathea is usually identified with either Ramleh or Ramathaim-Zophim, where David came to Samuel (1 Samuel chapter 19).

See also

 Christian mythology
 Myrrhbearers
 Seven Sorrows of Mary

References

External links

The History of that Holy Disciple Joseph of Arimathea by Anonymous (1770)
Qumran text of Isaiah 53

 
1st-century deaths
Arthurian characters
British traditional history
Christian folklore
Christian saints from the New Testament
Followers of Jesus
Holy Grail
Romano-British saints
Saints from the Holy Land
Year of birth unknown
Caiaphas
Myrrhbearers
Descent from the Cross